František Ženíšek (25 May 1849 – 15 November 1916) was a Czech painter. He was part of the "" (Generation of the National Theater), a large group of artists with nationalistic sympathies.

Biography 
He was born in Prague into a family of merchants and displayed an affinity for art at an early age. Reluctantly his father agreed to let him pursue his interests and allowed him to take lessons from Karel Javůrek while he was still in school. From 1863 to 1865, he was at the Academy of Fine Arts, studying with Eduard von Engerth. After a brief stay in Vienna, assisting Engerth with work at the State Opera, he was back at the Academy in Prague, working with Jan Swerts and the history painter Josef Matyáš Trenkwald.

In 1875, he received his first major commission; painting murals at the city hall in Courtrai, Belgium. Then, in 1878, while making a study trip to Paris, he gained an important friend and supporter in Josef Šebestián Daubek, a well-known patron of the arts, who engaged him to decorate his home in Liteň. Ženíšek later accompanied Daubek on his honeymoon to Holland, and painted a portrait of the new couple.

Soon after returning from Paris, he and Mikoláš Aleš won a competition to decorate the foyer of the National Theater with historic and allegorical designs. Ženíšek went on to decorate the auditorium ceiling and design a curtain, although the curtain was destroyed by a fire in 1881. He also painted windows at the church in Karlín and lunettes at the National Museum as well as over 80 portraits.

From 1885 to 1896, he was a professor at the Academy of Arts, Architecture and Design, where his assistant was Jakub Schikaneder. Then, from 1896 to 1915, he was a professor at the Academy of Fine Arts, where his students included Jaroslav Špillar and Jan Preisler. In 1898, he was one of the founders of "" (Union of Fine Artists), in an effort to strengthen the Czech nationalist viewpoint in the arts. Ženíšek died on 15 November 1916, in Prague.

His son, František (1877–1935) was also a painter of some note.

Selected paintings

References

Further reading 

 František Xaver Jiřík, František Ženíšek, Jednota Umělců Výtvarných, 1906
 Prokop Toman, Profesor František Ženíšek (exhibition catalog), Jednota umělců výtvarných, 1938 
 Naděžda Blažíčková-Horová, František Ženíšek (1849 - 1916), Národní galerie, 2005 ,

External links 
 
 Oldřich and Božena a video from Česká televize
 Tony Ozuna, "Visual historian of a nation" from the Prague Post, 2006 

1849 births
1916 deaths
Artists from Prague
History painters
Czech nationalism
19th-century Czech painters
Czech male painters
20th-century Czech painters
Burials at Olšany Cemetery
19th-century Czech male artists
20th-century Czech male artists
Academic staff of the Academy of Arts, Architecture and Design in Prague